Tjitske Jacoba Reidinga (born 20 February 1972) is a Dutch actress and comedian. Reidinga began her career on stage and acted in numerous plays. She won a Colombina award for her role in Who's Afraid of Virginia Woolf in 2002. She made her screen debut in 1996. Her first major film role was as "Jet" in Ja Zuster, Nee Zuster (2002). She is probably known best for her role as 'Claire' in the successful Dutch series Gooische vrouwen.

Early life 
She was born in Leeuwarden, The Netherlands, but grew up in Africa. Her parents moved to Uganda shortly after they got together. Her father who had just graduated from Academie Minerva, an art school in Groningen, found a job at an advertising agency in Kampala. They moved back to the Netherlands to flee Idi Amin's reign of terror. Her mother was pregnant at the time, and a few months later she was born in the Frisian capital.

After she was born her parents wanted to go back to Africa, and the three went to Malawi where she lived until the age of 8. She remembered it as a beautiful country with a glittering lake (Lake Nyasa), where she could play freely. Her brother Hesling was born there and a few years later they returned to the Netherlands. She had a hard time trying to adjust herself to the cold and crowded country where she was born.

Becoming an actress 

Ever since she was a little girl she knew she wanted to be an actress. Her parents had always fully supported their daughter's dream. Strengthened by her parents confidence, she never considered the possibility her dream wouldn't come true. If so she'd have quite a problem, having nothing in reserve. The only moment she had her doubts was at the academy. She noticed her teachers did not share her parents' trust. They had no idea what to make of her and as a result she had to do the year all over again. Though being very disappointed, she was strong an resilient and finally graduated in 1997. On her time at the Amsterdamse Toneelschool she commented:
"Op de Toneelschool word je klaargestoomd om de keiharde praktijk aan te kunnen. Maar na m'n afstuderen heb ik de praktijk eigenlijk als een stuk makkelijker ervaren dan de opleiding." ("At the academy you are crammed for the real thing, but after I graduated I actually found my training a lot harder than acting as a job.")

Career

Theatre 
After her graduation she made a flashy start on stage at RO Theater, one of the major theatrical companies in the Netherlands, in the play "De ziekte die jeugd heet". Since then she has appeared in almost twenty different plays. One of those was 2001 production of Who's afraid of Virginia Woolf by Hummelinck Stuurman. For the latter she received a Colombina award for "Best Female Supporting Role" as child-wife Honey in 2002.

Theatre credits

Film 
Her first role was a walk-on in the 1996 production De Zeemeerman. Later she appeared in a few more feature films such as "Ja Zuster, Nee Zuster" (2000 Pieter Kramer), "Kees de Jongen" (2003 André van Duren), "De Passievrucht" (2003 Maarten Treurniet) and "Ellis in Glamourland" (2004 Pieter Kramer).

Film credits

Television 
She is seen weekly in Children's television series Klokhuis (NPS) as "prinsesje Petronella", as well as "dochter konijn" ("daughter rabbit" -being the daughter of mother rabbit (Loes Luca). She also seen in "FIT" (IDTV), "Spangen", "Ibbeltje" (BOS BROS), "De Band" (VARA) and "Keyzer en de Boer Advocaten" (NCRV/KRO). She is without a doubt best known for her starring role in the successful television series "Gooische Vrouwen" (Endemol).

Television credits

Personal life 
Whilst in the academy in Amsterdam she got to know actor Vincent Croiset, whom she is now with for ten years. They have two children together, twins Foppe and Klaas. They are not married but have plans to do so in the future.

References

External links

 Details on the Colombina award she won in 2002 at Moose.nl
 Killendoornse Courant Interview (2002)
 Moov Interview (2005)

 

Dutch film actresses
Dutch stage actresses
Dutch television actresses
People from Leeuwarden
1972 births
Living people
20th-century Dutch actresses
21st-century Dutch actresses